Catherine Clark may refer to:

 Catherine Clark (broadcaster)
 Catherine Clark (sports administrator)
 Catherine Clark Kroeger, American writer, professor
 Catherine Anthony Clark, Canadian children's author

See also
 Catherine Clarke (disambiguation)
 Katherine Clarke (disambiguation)
 Katherine Clark